Anthousa is a small town in the municipal unit of Tsotyli, Kozani regional unit, Greece.

References

Populated places in Kozani (regional unit)